Farben (German: "color") may refer to:

IG Farben - former German chemical industry conglomerate
IG Farben Building - former corporate headquarters of IG Farben in Frankfurt, Germany
IG Farben Trial - the war crimes trial of 24 IG Farben executives following World War II
Jan Jelinek - German electronic musician, who has performed under the name "Farben"
Farben Lehre - Polish punk rock band
Third movement of Arnold Schoenberg's Five Pieces for Orchestra